The aortic orifice, (aortic opening) is a circular opening, in front and to the right of the left atrioventricular orifice, from which it is separated by the anterior cusp of the bicuspid valve.

It is guarded by the aortic semilunar valve.

The portion of the ventricle immediately below the aortic orifice is termed the aortic vestibule, and has fibrous instead of muscular walls.

References

External links

Circulatory system